Paratemelia meyi is a species of moth of the family Oecophoridae. It is known from Namibia.

References

Endemic fauna of Namibia
Amphisbatinae
Insects of Namibia
Moths of Africa